The Northwest Panay Peninsula Natural Park is located on the island of Panay, in the provinces of Aklan and Antique of the Philippines which was proclaimed a natural park by President Gloria Macapagal Arroyo on 18 April 2002 (Presidential Proclamation No. 186, 2002). The Northwest Panay Peninsula Natural Park has an area of 120.09 km2, found within the municipalities of Nabas, Malay, Buruanga, Libertad and Pandan.

Watershed area 
The Northwest Panay Peninsula Natural Park is also an important watershed. The forest of the Natural Park channels the water from the rains into a system of springs and rivers that provide water for over 100,000 inhabitants. The water for Boracay Island and the hundreds of thousands of tourists that visit there every year is also provided by the Northwest Panay watershed.

Protection activities 
As this area is considered highly important, the Northwest Panay Biodiversity Management Council (NPBMC) was formed in 1999 to protect it. The NPBMC is made up of the local government units of Northwest Panay, Non-governmental organizations like BioCon, and National and Local Government Agencies like the Department of Environment and Natural Resources (DENR).

In March 2016, the German government has provided 4 million Euro (Php200-million) grant for a forest protection project.

Flora and Fauna 
The site is home to a wide range of flora and fauna of the Western Visayas.

Peaks

List of peaks in Northwest Panay Mountain Range by elevation.

 Mount Tinayunga 
 Mount Guimbarogtog 
 Mount Butong 
 Mount Potol 
 Mount Tungo 
 Mount Guibulon 
 Mount Banjao 
 Mount Pinapoan 
 Mount Duyong 
 Mount Mab-o 
 Mount Tinagtacan 
 Mount Cumaingin 
 Mount Malagud

See also
 Sibalom Natural Park
 List of national parks of the Philippines
 List of protected areas of the Philippines
 List of World Heritage Sites in the Philippines

References

See also 
List of protected areas of the Philippines

Natural parks of the Philippines
Geography of Aklan
Geography of Antique (province)
Tourist attractions in Aklan
Tourist attractions in Antique (province)
Protected areas established in 2002
2002 establishments in the Philippines